This is a list of libraries located in Lahore, Pakistan. It includes both public lending libraries and research libraries.

Atomic Energy Minerals Centre Library
Model Town Library
ITU-Library & Learning Resource Centre
Babar Ali Library, Aitchison College
Defence Public Library Complex
Dr Baqir's Library
Dyal Singh Trust LibraryThe Dyal Singh Trust Library was established in Lahore in 1908 in pursuance of the will of the Sardar Dyal Singh Majithia. It was first set up in the Exchange Building, which was the residence of Sardar Dyal Singh.
The Ewing Memorial LibraryThe Ewing Memorial Library was built in 1943 and named for Dr. Sir J.C.R. Ewing, the second Principal of the College. The library has been one of the oldest and best college libraries in Lahore and Pakistan and now is gradually transforming itself into a state-of-the-art University Library by increasing the number of volumes that will be available to the students of the University as well as College students.
Islamia College Library, Islamia College
Government College Library, Government College University
Lahore University of Management Sciences Library, Lahore University of Management Sciences
National Library of Engineering SciencesThe national library of the University plays a vital role in achieving the objectives of the institution like Study & Teaching, Research & Extension Services, and Dissemination of Information etc. It is fully air conditioned having a fine atmosphere conducive to Study & Research. It has a seating capacity of about 400 readers at its different floors.
Pakistan Administrative Staff College Library
People's Bank Library
Provincial Assembly of the Punjab Library
Punjab Public Library
Quaid-e-Azam LibraryA highly detailed model of a newly constructed library was named as Quaid-e-Azam Library, after Muhammad Ali Jinnah. It is located at Bagh-e-Jinnah, which was once known as Lawrance Gardens.

See also
List of educational institutions in Lahore
List of universities in Lahore
Origin of Lahore
History of Lahore

References

Lahore-related lists